Diva is a 2007 Malaysian film that was jointly produced by Nusantara Films, a subsidiary of Astro Shaw, and the independent film production house Tarantella Pictures. It was directed by Sharad Sharan, an Indian citizen working in Indonesia, and with music composed by Mithoon Sharma, an Indian citizen. Diva had a cast composed of Indonesians and Malaysians. The film was produced at a cost of 3.5 million rupiahs. It had a simultaneous release scheduled for June 2007 in Brunei, India, Indonesia, Malaysia, and Singapore. The screening was scheduled to begin on 28 June of that year.

The musical is about Kartika, an Indonesian singer. After returning from travelling abroad, Kartika seeks to develop the skills of four young people but they instead sign up for a record label competing against her label.

The film soundtrack CD, the first musical collaboration between India and Malaysia, was released on 15 March 2007 in Brunei, India, Indonesia, Malaysia, and Singapore. Mithoon, a 21-year-old, composed five of the songs. Loloq wrote the lyrics.

Cast
 Ning Baizura - Kartika
 Adam AF2 - Idit
 Jeremy Thomas - Arman
 Balkisyh Semundurkhan - Eja
 Awal Ashaari - Jay
 Jessica Iskandar - Mera

References

External links

 

Malaysian drama films
2007 films
Malay-language films
Astro Shaw films